Tsutomu Yanagida is a Japanese physicist who first proposed the seesaw mechanism in 1979 and developed the model of leptogenesis. The name of the seesaw mechanism was given by him in a Tokyo conference in 1981. In 1994, he predicted, together with M. Fukugita, the nonzero cosmological constant Λ = (3 ± 1 meV)4  four years prior to the observation in order to resolve the age discrepancy between the Universe and some old stars.

Tsutomu Yanagida received a PhD in physics at Hiroshima University in 1977. In 1979, he proposed the seesaw mechanism, that explains the mass of neutrinos by introduction heavy right-handed neutrinos. Together with M. Fukugita, he developed the model of leptogenesis that traces the baryon asymmetry back to a lepton asymmetry. Till 2019 he was professor at Kavli Institute for Physics and Mathematics of the Universe at Tokyo University. Some of his students in Tokyo were Yasunori Nomura, Junji Hisano and Takeo Moroi. In 2019, he was appointed professor at Shanghai Jiao Tong University. His research includes theoretical particle physics, string theory and cosmology. Yanagida works on super symmetry, inflation and the baryon asymmetry. He is corresponding member of the  Academy of Sciences and Humanities in Hamburg. In 2017 he visited the Higgs Centre of Theoretical Physics at Edinburgh University as guest scientist.

Honours 

 2020: The Particle Physics Medal (Physical Society of Japan)
2014: Helmholtz International Fellow Award
2012: Youji Totsuka Prize
2011: Hertz Lecture at DESY Hamburg
2003: Alexander von Humboldt Prize
1992: Nishina Memorial Prize
1989: Yukawa Memorial Prize

Publications (selection)

Books 

 Masataka Fukugita, Tsutomu Yanagida: Physics of Neutrinos and Application to Astrophysics, Springer, 2003

References

External links 

 Academic family at academictree.org
 Publications at INSPIRE-HEP
 Slides about seesaw mechanismus and leptogenesis

Living people
Japanese physicists
Hiroshima University alumni
1949 births